Twelfth-seeded Yan Zi and Zheng Jie defeated first-seeded Lisa Raymond and Samantha Stosur, 2–6, 7–6 (7), 6–3 to win the women's doubles title at the 2006 Australian Open.

Seeds

Draw

Finals

Top half

Section 1

Section 2

Bottom half

Section 3

Section 4

External links
 2006 Australian Open – Women's draws and results at the International Tennis Federation
WTA Draw on page 3
Australian Open 2006 – Schedule of Play

Women's Doubles
Australian Open (tennis) by year – Women's doubles
2006 in Australian women's sport